Armand Simon (1880 – 14 April 1957) was a Swiss tennis player. He competed at the  1920 Summer Olympics representing Switzerland. Charles participated in the men's singles and in men's doubles. In the men's doubles at the 1920 Summer Olympics, he partnered the fellow tennis player, Hans Syz.

References

External links 
Profile at Olympic.org

Swiss male tennis players
Tennis players at the 1920 Summer Olympics
Olympic tennis players of Switzerland
1880 births
1957 deaths
Place of birth missing